The Ghostbusters of East Finchley is a British comedy-drama series written by Tony Grounds, starring Paul Reynolds, Catherine Holman, Bill Paterson, Jan Francis and Ray Winstone. It was developed by BBC Television and ran for one series, a total of six episodes were produced and was shown on BBC2 in 1995.

Premise 
The series focuses on a young misfit Kevin Pullen (Reynolds) who lives on a council estate in East Finchley. He's a work-shy dreamer who becomes suspicious about his mother Grace's (Francis) lecherous employer Thane (Winstone), so he organises a surveillance operation by following him around town in order to find out more about his activities. His friend and neighbour Jackie (Holman) works at the Inland Revenue and is intrigued by Kevin's efforts, so she encourages him to join her organisation and learn the tropes as a tax fraud investigator.  The local tax office is run by the ambitious and shrewd Mr. Small (Paterson) who uses unorthodox methods such as ghosting (going undercover) potential tax evaders in order to uncover their crimes. Kevin agrees to work at the Inland Revenue on condition that Jackie will use her skills in her trade to assist him with his investigations on Thane and find a way to prosecute him for his tax dodging offences.

Background 
Following on from his success with his offbeat comedy drama series Gone to the Dogs, Tony Grounds was approached by BBC producer Andree Molyneux about the idea for doing a serious drama series about tax evasion.  Although initially aprehensive about the project, Grounds agreed to do the series on condition he was able to reformat it as a comedy. His concept for the series was for a burgeoning love story between Kevin and Jackie set within the everyday operations of a tax office, with an on-going subplot focussing on their investigations into Thane's financial dealings. When interviewed about the series by Lucy Vanoli from The Stage, Grounds noted "to me, if you look at the world, everything seems strange. Everyone seems mad except you and your family." He further elaborated that he wanted to do a series that was quirky and original and unlike anything else seen on television. He gave the series a surrealistic angle by including eccentric characters, dream sequences and bizarre set pieces such as the hole in the ceiling which Kevin and Jackie use to communicate from their respective bedrooms.

Cast 
 Paul Reynolds – Kevin Pullen
 Catherine Holman – Jackie
 Bill Paterson – Mr. Small
 Jan Francis – Grace Pullen
 Ray Winstone – Thane
 Christopher Fulford – Frankie Pullen
 Jane Cox – Brenda
 Sheila Reid – Hilda
 Joe Melia – Stan
 Marc Warren – Butch
 Anthony Head – Terry
 Carol MacReady – Elizabeth
 Ace Bhatti – DI Cunliffe

Episodes

Reception 
The series received a mixed response from journalists at the time of its transmission. Joe Steeples from the Sunday Mirror described the series as too quirky for its own good and was one to miss, while Jaci Stephen from the Daily Mirror, described the series as a very funny comedy, full of lovely, funny lines and characters; she particuarly praised Holman and Paterson for their unlikely double act.  Meanwhile, the surreal angle of the series, Melanie Henderson writing for the Aberdeen Evening Express, states was almost perverse and rather refreshing, but not exactly intriguing.

Home Media 
To date, the series has not been commercially released on VHS or DVD.

External links 

 
 The Ghostbusters of East Finchley at TVDB
 The Ghostbusters of East Finchley at British Comedy Guide

References